Ville-de-Mont-Royal is a future Réseau express métropolitain station, expected to open in 2024.

Until May 2020, this station was named Mont-Royal and was a commuter rail station operated by Exo. It was served by the Deux-Montagnes line and Mascouche line until its closure in 2020.

Origin of name

Mont-Royal takes its name from Town of Mount Royal (in French, Ville-Mont-Royal), where the station is located; the town in turn, takes its name from Mount Royal, the mountain that dominates the Island of Montreal.

In the city of Montreal, there is also an unrelated Metro station of the same name.

Location
Connaught Park is inside this traffic circle

History
Mont-Royal station was until 1992 a stop for Via Rail passenger trains leaving or approaching Montreal's  on this track. The Mascouche line started service on 1 December 2014.

Beginning in May 2018, due to its 4-year-long process of being converted to light rapid transit, only one of its two platforms was used for travel in both directions; the same was true for its neighbouring station Canora (inbound). The station was closed in 2020 and is scheduled to reopen in 2024 as a light metro station in the second phase of the Réseau express métropolitain.

Connecting bus routes

References

External links

 Mont-Royal Commuter Train Station Information (RTM)
 Mont-Royal Commuter Train Station Schedule (RTM) - Deux-Montagnes line
 Mont-Royal Commuter Train Station Schedule (RTM) - Mascouche line
 2016 STM System Map

Former Exo commuter rail stations
Railway stations in Montreal
Mount Royal, Quebec
Réseau express métropolitain railway stations
Railway stations in Canada opened in 1918